Burleigh Arland Grimes (August 18, 1893 – December 6, 1985) was an American professional baseball player and manager, and the last pitcher officially permitted to throw the spitball. Grimes made the most of this advantage, as well as his unshaven, menacing presence on the mound, which earned him the nickname "Ol' Stubblebeard." He won 270 MLB games, pitched in four World Series over the course of his 19-year career, and was elected to the Baseball Hall of Fame in 1964. A decade earlier, he had been inducted into the Wisconsin Athletic Hall of Fame.

Early life
Born in Emerald, Wisconsin, Grimes was the first child of Cecil "Nick" Grimes, a farmer and former day laborer, and Ruth Tuttle, the daughter of a former Wisconsin legislator. Having previously played baseball for several local teams, Nick Grimes managed the Clear Lake Yellow Jackets and taught his son how to play the game early in life. Burleigh Grimes also participated in boxing as a child.

He made his professional debut in 1912 for the Eau Claire Commissioners of the Minnesota–Wisconsin League. From almost the beginning of his career, he threw a spitball, using slippery elm to alter the baseball's face. He played in Ottumwa, Iowa, in 1913 for the Ottumwa Packers in the Central Association.

MLB career

In 1917, he lost 13 straight decisions. Before the 1918 season, he was sent to the Brooklyn Dodgers in a multiplayer trade. When the spitball was banned in 1920, he was named as one of 17 established pitchers who were allowed to continue to throw the pitch. According to Baseball Digest, the Phillies were able to hit him because they knew when he was throwing the spitter.

He then pitched for the New York Giants, the Pirates again (–), the Boston Braves and the St. Louis Cardinals (1930-). With the Pirates in 1928, he posted a 25–14 record, posting the most wins, complete games, shutouts, and innings pitched of any NL pitcher. In the 1931 World Series, despite suffering a dislocated vertebra before Game 7, Grimes pitched  innings, earning the win to clinch the series victory for the Cardinals. He was traded to the Chicago Cubs before the 1932 season in exchange for Hack Wilson and Bud Teachout. Grimes was nicknamed "Ol' Stubblebeard", related to his habit of not shaving on days in which he was going to pitch.

Grimes was a very good hitting pitcher in his major league career, posting a .248 batting average (380-for-1535) with 157 runs, 62 doubles, 11 triples, 2 home runs and 168 RBI. He also drew 69 bases on balls. He had nine seasons with 10 or more RBIs, with a high of 16 in 1920 and 1928. In four World Series appearances (1920, 1930-1932) he hit .316 (6-for-19) with 1 run and 2 RBI.

At the time of his retirement, he was the last player who was legally allowed to throw a spitball, as he was one of 17 spitballers permitted to throw the pitch after it was otherwise outlawed in 1920. Baseball historian Frank Russo called him "baseball's most aggressive spitballer". Grimes had acquired a lasting field reputation for his temperament. He was known for wanting to win in any way possible. Prior to a game against the Giants late in 1924, Grimes organized a team meeting and said, "Anyone who doesn't want to play today's game to win, let me know right now." Then, on his first pitch, he knocked down a Giant. He is listed in the Baseball Hall of Shame series for having thrown a ball at the batter in the on-deck circle. The only two batters Grimes apparently could not intimidate were Hall of Famers Frankie Frisch and Paul Waner. If Grimes threw a close pitch to them, the batters usually followed it up with a hard-hit line drive. Grimes's friends and supporters note that he was consistently a kind man when off the diamond. Others claim he showed a greedy attitude to many people who 'got on his bad side.' He would speak mainly only to his best friend Ivy Olson in the dugout, and would pitch only to a man named Mathias Schroeder before games. Schroeder's identity was not well known among many Dodger players, as many say he was just 'a nice guy from the neighborhood.' Dodger manager Wilbert Robinson did not get along well with Grimes, using a clubhouse attendant to tell Grimes when he pitched so that he could talk to Grimes as little as possible.

Grimes had a total of 36 Major League teammates who would later be elected to the Hall of Fame. No other Hall of Famer had more Hall of Fame teammates.

Post-playing career
Grimes moved to the minor leagues in 1935 as a player-manager for the Bloomington Bloomers of the Illinois–Indiana–Iowa League. He started 21 games for the team, recording a 2.34 ERA and a 10–5 record. He did not pitch again after that season, moving on to manage the Louisville Colonels of the American Association.

Grimes was the manager of the Dodgers in 1937–38. He followed Casey Stengel's term as Dodgers manager. He compiled a two-year record of 131-171 (.434), with his teams finishing sixth and seventh respectively in the National League. Babe Ruth was one of Grimes's coaches. Leo Durocher was the team's shortstop in 1937 and a coach in 1938. When Grimes was fired by general manager Larry MacPhail after the 1938 season, Durocher was hired to replace him. MacPhail said the team's morale had not been right for a long period of time.

Grimes remained in baseball for many years as a minor league manager and a scout. He scouted for the Yankees, Athletics, and Orioles.

He managed the Toronto Maple Leafs of the International League from 1942 to 1944, and again in 1952 and 1953, winning the pennant in 1943. 

As a scout with the Baltimore Orioles, Grimes discovered Jim Palmer and Dave McNally.  

Grimes also assisted in managing the Independence Yankees in Independence, Kansas in 1948 and 1949, where Mickey Mantle started his professional career in 1949.

Later life
In 1981, Lawrence Ritter and Donald Honig included Grimes in their book The 100 Greatest Baseball Players of All Time.

Grimes died following a protracted battle with cancer at age 92 on December 6, 1985, in Clear Lake, Wisconsin. His wife Lillian survived him. He is buried in Block 88, Lot 3, Space 2 of the Clear Lake Cemetery.

See also

 List of Major League Baseball career wins leaders
 List of Major League Baseball annual strikeout leaders
 List of Major League Baseball annual wins leaders
 List of members of the Baseball Hall of Fame
 List of Major League Baseball career hit batsmen leaders

Notes

References
Niese, Joe (2013). Burleigh Grimes: Baseball's Last Legal Spitballer. McFarland. .

External links

　

cmgworldwide.com Official website

Burleigh Grimes Oral History Interview (1 of 2) - National Baseball Hall of Fame Digital Collection
Burleigh Grimes Oral History Interview (2 of 2) - National Baseball Hall of Fame Digital Collection

1893 births
1985 deaths
Baltimore Orioles scouts
Baseball players from Wisconsin
Birmingham Barons players
Bloomington Bloomers players
Boston Braves players
Brooklyn Dodgers managers
Brooklyn Robins players
Chattanooga Lookouts players
Chicago Cubs players
Deaths from cancer in Wisconsin
Eau Claire Commissioners players
Kansas City Athletics coaches
Kansas City Athletics scouts
Kansas City Blues (baseball) managers
Louisville Colonels (minor league) managers
Major League Baseball pitchers
Major League Baseball pitching coaches
Montreal Royals managers
National Baseball Hall of Fame inductees
National League strikeout champions
National League wins champions
New York Giants (NL) players
New York Yankees players
New York Yankees scouts
Ottumwa Packers players
People from Polk County, Wisconsin
People from St. Croix County, Wisconsin
Pittsburgh Pirates players
Richmond Colts players
Rochester Red Wings managers
St. Louis Cardinals players
Toronto Maple Leafs (International League) managers